Te Hemo Ata Henare is a New Zealand Māori tohunga raranga (master weaver).

Biography 

Henare learnt to weave when she was 12 years old. As an adult she became a teacher of weaving, and teaches at NorthTec polytechnic college in Northland.

She holds a bachelor's degree and a master's degree in Māori visual arts from Massey University.

Henare is deputy chair of Te Roopu Raranga Whatu o Aotearoa.

References

External links
 Henare discussing the state of fibre arts in New Zealand RNZ Te Ahi Kaa mo 14 o Poutu te rangi (14 March 2010)

Living people
New Zealand Māori weavers
Massey University alumni
Year of birth missing (living people)